RFA may refer to:

Government and private organizations
 Radio Free Asia, a private news broadcaster and publisher in East Asia, funded in part by the U.S. government
 Renewable Fuels Agency, a former UK renewable fuel regulatory agency
 Renewable Fuels Association, a body representing the U.S. ethanol industry
 République fédérale d'Allemagne, the French acronym for the Federal Republic of Germany
 Rocket Factory Augsburg, a German New Space start-up located in Augsburg.

Military
 Royal Field Artillery, a unit of the British Army from 1899 to 1924
 Royal Fleet Auxiliary, a civilian-crewed fleet owned by the United Kingdom's Ministry of Defence

Sports
 Restricted free agent, in professional sports
 Resurrection Fighting Alliance, a former mixed martial arts promotion based in the United States
 Rugby Fives Association,  the governing body for the sport of Rugby Fives

Other uses
 Radiofrequency ablation,  a medical procedure in which tissue is burned away using electrically generated heat
 Red Faction: Armageddon, a video game released in 2011
 Regional Forest Agreement, a series of plans for conservation of Australian forests
 Regulatory Flexibility Act, a 1980 act of the U.S. Congress
Report for America, a national service program for emerging journalists in the U.S.
 Request for admissions, part of US civil law procedures
 Requests for adminship, on Wikipedia
 Ring Fit Adventure, a Nintendo RPG exercise game released in 2019
 Royal Frankish Annals, Latin records of the state of the Frankish monarchy from 741 to 829